The 2020 Washington State Cougars football team represented Washington State University during the 2020 NCAA Division I FBS football season. They were led by first-year head coach Nick Rolovich. The team played their home games in Martin Stadium in Pullman, Washington, and competed as members of the North Division of the Pac-12 Conference.

On August 11, 2020, the Pac-12 Conference initially canceled all fall sports competitions due to the COVID-19 pandemic.

On September 24, the conference announced that a six-game conference-only season would begin on November 6, with the Pac-12 Championship Game to be played December 18. Teams not selected for the championship game would be seeded to play a seventh game.

Previous season
The Cougars finished the season 6–7, 3–6 in Pac-12 play to finish tied for fifth in the Northern Division. They were invited to play in the Cheez-It Bowl, where they lost to Air Force 31–21. On January 9, head coach Mike Leach departed the program to accept the vacant head coaching position at Mississippi State. Less than a week later, athletic director Pat Chun hired Hawaii head coach Nick Rolovich.

Schedule
Washington State had games scheduled against Utah State, Houston, and Idaho, but canceled these games on July 10 due to the Pac-12 Conference's decision to play a conference-only schedule due to the COVID-19 pandemic.

#WeAreUnited controversy 
In the wake of the COVID-19 pandemic, student athletes of the Pac-12 Conference formed a unity group to negotiate with the conference to get more fair treatment for student athletes ranging from COVID-19 safety protocols to racial equality messages under the threat of opting out of the fall season with the hashtag #WeAreUnited.

On August 2, 2020, Washington State wide receiver Kassidy Woods alleged that head coach Nick Rolovich threatened his status on the team, while also being removed from the team chats and being told to clear out his locker. Woods also released an audio conversation between him and Rolovich to the Dallas Morning News, where Rolovich was understanding of Woods opting out due to COVID-19 but was still critical of the unity group. Rolovich said in a statement that the said conversation between him and Woods occurred before the release of the #WeAreUnited group's article, and Washington State spokesman Bill Stephens clarified that Woods did not lose his scholarship or has been cut from the team, while ESPN reported that no one has been cut, but is not allowed to participate in team activities if they choose to opt out due to safety reasons.

Personnel

Staff

Rankings

Game summaries

at Oregon State

Oregon

at USC

at Utah

Awards

References

Washington State
Washington State Cougars football seasons
Washington State Cougars football